Final league standings for the 1919-20 St. Louis Soccer League.

History
Although Ben Millers and Innisfails tied with 23 points each, Ben Millers was declared champion based on the higher number of ties compared to Innisfails.  Typically, the SLSL broke points ties by comparing the number of losses, but both teams had lost eight games.  The number of ties was then used to determine the winner.

League standings

External links
St. Louis Soccer Leagues (RSSSF)
The Year in American Soccer - 1920

1919-20
1919–20 domestic association football leagues
1919–20 in American soccer
St Louis Soccer
St Louis Soccer